Sadananda Swami may refer to:

Ayyavu Swamikal (1814-1909)
Sadananda (1908-1977)